The 2013 Billboard Music Awards ceremony was held on May 19, 2013 at the MGM Grand Garden Arena in Las Vegas, Nevada. It was aired on ABC at 8:00/7:00 PM central. The show was hosted by Tracy Morgan.

Performances

Presenters
Shania Twain — Presented "Top Rap Artist"
Jennifer Nettles – Introduced The Band Perry
Carly Rae Jepsen — Introduced Icona Pop
PSY — Introduced Chris Brown
Alyssa Milano and Avril Lavigne — Presented "Top Digital Song"
Hayden Panettiere — Introduced Macklemore and Ryan Lewis
Kid Rock — Presented "Top Rap Song"
Selena Gomez — Introduced Taylor Swift
Florida Georgia Line — Introduced Kacey Musgraves
will.i.am — Presented "Top Touring Artist"
Ariana Grande — Introduced Justin Bieber
Emmy Rossum and Jason Derulo — Presented "Top Billboard 200 Album"
Ke$ha — Introduced Pitbull and Christina Aguilera
Miley Cyrus — Presented "Top Male Artist"
Jennifer Morrison — Introduced Miguel
Chloë Grace Moretz — Introduced Ed Sheeran
Gabriel Mann and Stana Katic — Introduced Jennifer Lopez and Pitbull
Kelly Rowland and Austin Mahone — Presented "EDM – Electronic Dance Music"
Wiz Khalifa and SkyBlu — Introduced will.i.am and Justin Bieber
Jenny McCarthy – Introduced David Guetta, Akon and Ne-Yo
Cee Lo Green — Presented "Milestone Award"
Celine Dion — Presented "Artist of the Year"
Erykah Badu and Janelle Monáe – Presented "Icon Award"

Winners and nominees
Winners are listed first.
{| class=wikitable
|-
! style="background:#EEDD85; width=50%" | Top Artist
! style="background:#EEDD85; width=50%" | Top New Artist
|-
| valign="top" |
Taylor Swift
Justin Bieber
Maroon 5
One Direction
Rihanna
| valign="top" |
One Direction
Carly Rae Jepsen
Gotye
PSY
The Lumineers
|-
! style="background:#EEDD82; width=50%" |Top Male Artist
! style="background:#EEDD82; width=50%" |Top Female Artist
|-
| valign="top" |
Justin Bieber
Bruno Mars
Drake
Flo Rida
Jason Aldean
| valign="top" |
Taylor Swift
Adele
Carly Rae Jepsen
Nicki Minaj
Rihanna
|-
! style="background:#EEDD82; width=50%" |Top Duo/Group
! style="background:#EEDD82; width=50%" |Top Billboard 200 Artist
|-
| valign="top" |
One Direction
Coldplay
fun.
Maroon 5
Mumford & Sons
| valign="top" |
Taylor Swift
Adele
Justin Bieber
Mumford & Sons
One Direction
|-
! style="background:#EEDD82; width=50%" |Top Billboard 200 Album
! style="background:#EEDD82; width=50%" |Top Hot 100 Artist
|-
| valign="top" |
Red – Taylor Swift'’'
21 – Adele
Babel – Mumford & Sons
Take Me Home – One Direction
Up All Night – One Direction
| valign="top" |Maroon 5Flo Rida
fun.
Rihanna
Taylor Swift
|-
! style="background:#EEDD82; width=50%" |Top Hot 100 Song
! style="background:#EEDD82; width=50%" |Top Touring Artist
|-
| valign="top" |
"Somebody That I Used to Know" - Gotye featuring Kimbra"Some Nights" – fun.
"Call Me Maybe" – Carly Rae Jepsen
"One More Night" – Maroon 5
"Payphone" – Maroon 5 featuring  Wiz Khalifa
| valign="top" |MadonnaBruce Springsteen
Coldplay
Lady Gaga
Roger Waters
|-
! style="background:#EEDD82; width=50%" |Top Digital Songs Artist
! style="background:#EEDD82; width=50%" |Top Digital Song
|-
| valign="top" |Taylor SwiftCarly Rae Jepsen
Flo Rida
fun.
Maroon 5
| valign="top" |
"Call Me Maybe"- Carly Rae Jepsen"We Are Young" – fun. featuring Janelle Monáe
"Somebody That I Used to Know" – Gotye featuring Kimbra
"Thrift Shop" – Macklemore & Ryan Lewis featuring Wanz
"Payphone" – Maroon 5 featuring Wiz Khalifa
|-
! style="background:#EEDD82; width=50%" |Top Radio Songs Artist
! style="background:#EEDD82; width=50%" |Top Radio Song
|-
| valign="top" |RihannaFlo Rida
fun.
Maroon 5
Nicki Minaj
| valign="top" |
"Somebody That I Used to Know" - Gotye featuring Kimbra"Locked Out of Heaven" – Bruno Mars
"Call Me Maybe" – Carly Rae Jepsen
"One More Night" – Maroon 5
"Payphone" – Maroon 5 featuring Wiz Khalifa
|-
! style="background:#EEDD82; width=50%" |Top Streaming Artist
! style="background:#EEDD82; width=50%" |Top Streaming Song (Audio)
|-
| valign="top" |Nicki MinajBaauer
Drake
PSY
Rihanna
| valign="top" |
"'Somebody That I Used to Know" - Gotye featuring Kimbra"Call Me Maybe" – Carly Rae Jepsen
"Lights" – Ellie Goulding
"Some Nights" – fun.
"We Are Young" – fun. featuring Janelle Monáe
|-
! style="background:#EEDD82; width=50%" |Top Streaming Song (Video)
! style="background:#EEDD82; width=50%" |Top Pop Artist
|-
| valign="top" |
"Gangnam Style" - PSY'"Call Me Maybe" – Carly Rae Jepsen
"Thrift Shop" – Macklemore & Ryan Lewis featuring Wanz
"We Are Never Ever Getting Back Together" – Taylor Swift
"We Are Young" – fun. featuring Janelle Monáe
| valign="top" |
One Direction
Adele
Justin Bieber
Maroon 5
Bruno Mars
|-
! style="background:#EEDD82; width=50%" |Top Pop Album
! style="background:#EEDD82; width=50%" |Top Pop Song
|-
| valign="top" |
21 - AdeleBelieve – Justin BieberOverexposed – Maroon 5Take Me Home – One DirectionUp All Night – One Direction
| valign="top" |
"Call Me Maybe" – Carly Rae Jepsen
"Lights" – Ellie Goulding
"Locked Out of Heaven" – Bruno Mars
"One More Night" – Maroon 5
"Payphone" – Maroon 5 featuring Wiz Khalifa
|-
! style="background:#EEDD82; width=50%" |Top R&B Artist
! style="background:#EEDD82; width=50%" |Top R&B Album
|-
| valign="top" |
Rihanna
Alicia Keys
Chris Brown
Ne-Yo
Usher
| valign="top" |
Unapologetic – RihannaGirl on Fire – Alicia KeysFortune – Chris BrownChannel Orange – Frank OceanLooking 4 Myself – Usher
|-
! style="background:#EEDD82; width=50%" |Top R&B Song
! style="background:#EEDD82; width=50%" |Top Rap Artist
|-
| valign="top" |
"Diamonds" – Rihanna
"Girl On Fire" – Alicia Keys featuring Nicki Minaj
"Adorn" – Miguel
"Thinkin Bout You" – Frank Ocean
"Heart Attack" – Trey Songz
| valign="top" |
Nicki Minaj
Drake
Flo Rida
Pitbull
PSY
|-
! style="background:#EEDD82; width=50%" |Top Rap Album
! style="background:#EEDD82; width=50%" |Top Rap Song
|-
| valign="top" |Pink Friday: Roman Reloaded – Nicki MinajBased On A T.R.U. Story – 2 ChainzGood Kid, M.A.A.D. City – Kendrick LamarThe Heist – Macklemore & Ryan LewisGod Forgives, I Don't – Rick Ross
| valign="top" |
"Thrift Shop" – Macklemore & Ryan Lewis featuring Wanz
"Whistle" – Flo Rida
"Wild Ones" – Flo Rida featuring Sia
"Mercy" – Kanye West, Big Sean, Pusha T, 2 Chainz
"Gangnam Style" – PSY
|-
! style="background:#EEDD82; width=50%" |Top Country Artist
! style="background:#EEDD82; width=50%" |Top Country Album
|-
| valign="top" |
Taylor Swift
Carrie Underwood
Hunter Hayes
Jason Aldean
Luke Bryan
| valign="top" |
Red – Taylor SwiftBlown Away – Carrie UnderwoodNight Train – Jason AldeanTuskegee – Lionel RichieTailgates & Tanlines – Luke Bryan
|-
! style="background:#EEDD82; width=50%" |Top Country Song
! style="background:#EEDD82; width=50%" |Top Rock Artist
|-
| valign="top" |
"We Are Never Ever Getting Back Together" – Taylor Swift
"Springsteen" – Eric Church
"Cruise" – Florida Georgia Line
"Wanted" – Hunter Hayes
"Drunk on You" – Luke Bryan
| valign="top" |
fun.
Bruce Springsteen
Coldplay
Gotye
Mumford & Sons
|-
! style="background:#EEDD82; width=50%" |Top Rock Album
! style="background:#EEDD82; width=50%" |Top Rock Song
|-
| valign="top" |
Babel – Mumford & SonsSome Nights – fun.My Head is an Animal – Of Monsters and MenThe World from the Side of the Moon – Phillip PhillipsThe Lumineers – The Lumineers
| valign="top" |
"Somebody That I Used to Know" – Gotye featuring Kimbra
"Some Nights" – fun.
"We Are Young" – fun. featuring Janelle Monáe
"Home" – Phillip Phillips
"Ho Hey" - The Lumineers
|-
! style="background:#EEDD82; width=50%" |Top Latin Artist
! style="background:#EEDD82; width=50%" |Top Latin Album
|-
| valign="top" |
Jenni Rivera
Don Omar
Prince Royce
Romeo Santos
Shakira
| valign="top" |La Misma Gran Señora – Jenni RiveraJoyas Prestadas: Banda – Jenni RiveraJoyas Prestadas: Pop – Jenni RiveraPhase II – Prince RoyceFormula: Vol. 1 – Romeo Santos
|-
! style="background:#EEDD82; width=50%" |Top Latin Song
! style="background:#EEDD82; width=50%" |Top Dance Artist
|-
| valign="top" |
"Ai Se Eu Te Pego" – Michel Teló
"Hasta Que Salga el Sol" – Don Omar
"Dutty Love" – Don Omar featuring Natti Natasha
"Bailando Por El Mundo" – Juan Magan featuring Pitbull & El Cata
"Algo Me Gusta de Ti" – Wisin & Yandel featuring Chris Brown & T-Pain
| valign="top" |
Madonna
Calvin Harris
David Guetta
Skrillex
Swedish House Mafia
|-
! style="background:#EEDD82; width=50%" |Top Dance Album
! style="background:#EEDD82; width=50%" |Top Dance Song
|-
| valign="top" |
MDNA – MadonnaNothing But the Beat – David GuettaAlbum Title Goes Here – deadmau5Sorry for Party Rocking — LMFAOBangarang – Skrillex
| valign="top" |
"Harlem Shake" – Baauer
"Titanium" – David Guetta featuring Sia
"Starships" – Nicki Minaj
"Gangnam Style" – PSY
"Where Have You Been" – Rihanna
|-
! style="background:#EEDD82; width=50%" |Top EDM Artist
! style="background:#EEDD82; width=50%" |Top EDM Album
|-
| valign="top" |
David Guetta
Calvin Harris
deadmau5
Skrillex
Swedish House Mafia
| valign="top" |
Bangarang – SkrillexScary Monsters and Nice Sprites – SkrillexNothing But the Beat – David GuettaAlbum Title Goes Here – deadmau5Until Now – Swedish House Mafia
|-
! style="background:#EEDD82; width=50%" |Top EDM Song
! style="background:#EEDD82; width=50%" |Top Christian Artist
|-
| valign="top" |
"Harlem Shake" – Baauer
"Feel So Close" – Calvin Harris
"Sweet Nothing" – Calvin Harris featuring Florence Welch
"Titanium" – David Guetta featuring Sia
"Don't You Worry Child" – Swedish House Mafia featuring John Martin
| valign="top" |
tobyMac
Casting Crowns
Chris Tomlin
Matt Redman
MercyMe
|-
! style="background:#EEDD82; width=50%" |Top Christian Album
! style="background:#EEDD82; width=50%" |Top Christian Song
|-
| valign="top" |Eye on It – tobyMacCome To The Well – Casting CrownsGravity – LecraeThe Hurt & The Healer – MercyMeWOW Hits 2013 – Various Artists
| valign="top" |
"10,000 Reasons (Bless The Lord)" – Matt Redman
"Redeemed" – Big Daddy Weave
"Where I Belong" – Building 429
"God's Not Dead (Like A Lion)" – newsboys
"Me Without You" – tobyMac
|-
! style="background:#EEDD82; width=50%" |Top Social Artist (fan-voted)
! style="background:#EEDD82; width=50%" |Milestone Award (fan-voted)
|-
| valign="top" |
Justin Bieber
Katy Perry
One Direction
Rihanna
Taylor Swift
| valign="top" |
Justin Bieber
Bruno Mars (runner-up)
Taylor Swift (runner-up)
Miguel
Pitbull
The Band Perry
|-
! style="background:#EEDD82; width=50%" colspan="2"|Icon Award
|-
|colspan="2" style="text-align: center;"|Prince
|-
|}

Artists with multiple wins and nominations

Live-GIFs

Tumblr chose the 2013 Billboard'' Music Awards as the basis for their first live TV integration. Creative agency Deckhouse Digital was hired for the event, designing an innovative live-gif system which allowed them to produce animated GIFs during the broadcast, and post them directly to Billboard's tumblr page in real time. Users of the blogging site were able to view and share animated images of  events unfolding on stage just minutes after watching them live on ABC.

References

External links

2013
Billboard awards
2013 in American music
2013 in Nevada
2013 music awards
MGM Grand Garden Arena